Anapsky (masculine), Anapskaya (feminine), or Anapskoye (neuter) may refer to:
Anapsky District, a district of Krasnodar Krai, Russia
Anapsky (rural locality) (Anapskaya, Anapskoye), name of several rural localities in Russia